Lands End is a park in San Francisco within the Golden Gate National Recreation Area.  It is a rocky and windswept shoreline at the mouth of the Golden Gate, situated between the Sutro District and Lincoln Park and abutting Fort Miley Military Reservation.  A memorial to USS San Francisco stands in the park.  Numerous hiking trails follow the former railbeds of the Ferries and Cliff House Railway along the cliffs and also down to the shore.

The most-traveled trail in Lands End is the Coastal Trail, a section of the California Coastal Trail that follows the railbed of the old Cliff House Railway. This trail is handicap-accessible until the Mile Rock Overlook, and bike accessible until the Eagles Point steps. A spur trail takes users to Mile Rock Point and Mile Rock Beach, which offer views of the Golden Gate.

Additionally, Lands End contains the ruins of the Sutro Baths. Other historic sites include numerous shipwrecks, which are visible at low tides from the Coastal Trail and Mile Rock.

A visitor center, Lands End Lookout, opened on April 28, 2012.

History
The Yelamu Ohlone tribe lived at Lands End before Spanish settlement began in 1776. After the Gold Rush, entrepreneurs designed the new Cliff House as a fashionable resort for the wealthy. A private company constructed a new road called Point Lobos Avenue. By the 1860s, a horse-drawn stagecoach made the trip every Sunday from crowded downtown San Francisco out to Lands End.  During the 1880s, millionaire Adolph Sutro constructed a passenger steam train from downtown to Lands End for the affordable fare of 5¢. In 1891, an old miner called Charles Jackson announced that he had discovered a vein of bituminous coal under the cliffs at Baker Beach, on Sutro's land; Sutro had a tunnel dug 200 feet under the railroad track and confirmed the find, but the mine was never exploited.

Labyrinth

Along the Coastal Trail at Eagle's Point, local artist Eduardo Aguilera constructed a "hidden labyrinth" overlooking Golden Gate Bridge in 2004. It has been vandalized numerous times and was destroyed in August 2015, but was rebuilt a month later by the artist with the help of 50 volunteers.

See also
 List of beaches in California
 List of California state parks

References

External links

 NPS−Golden Gate National Recreation Area: Visiting Lands End
 NPS-GGNRA: Lands End History and Culture
 Vestiges of Lands End — digital guidebook.
 Lands End at the Golden Gate Parks Conservancy

Geography of San Francisco
Golden Gate National Recreation Area
Parks in San Francisco
Richmond District, San Francisco